Zöllnitz is a municipality in the district of Saale-Holzland in Thuringia, Germany.

References

Municipalities in Thuringia
Saale-Holzland-Kreis
Duchy of Saxe-Altenburg